JTSB can refer to:
Japan Transport Safety Board
Japan Trustee Services Bank